Afërdita Tusha (4 September 1945 – 23 September 2018) was an Albanian female sports shooter who competed at the 1972 Summer Olympic Games against the men in the 50 metre free pistol, she finished 51st. She was the first woman to represent Albania at the Olympics.

References

External links
 

1945 births
2018 deaths
Albanian female sport shooters
Shooters at the 1972 Summer Olympics
Olympic shooters of Albania